Tobias Edén (born 7 October 1995) is a Swedish professional golfer and European Tour player.

Early life and amateur career
Edén was born in Karlstad and had success on the junior circuit. In 2012 he won the Swedish Junior Matchplay Championship and topped the Swedish Junior Tour Order of Merit, earning the Annika Sörenstam Trophy.

He joined the National Team and won the 2012 European Boys' Team Championship, as well as the bronze at the 2015 European Amateur Team Championship.

Edén accepted a golf scholarship to Arizona State University and played with the Arizona State Sun Devils men's golf team between 2014 and 2018. He graduated with a degree in business communication.

Professional career
Edén turned professional in 2018 and joined the Nordic Golf League where he won his first tournament, the Frederikshavn Championship, in Denmark in 2021. He finished tied 12th at the 2022 Dormy Open on the Challenge Tour. 

In November 2022, he shot a 61 in the third round to finish 11th at European Tour Qualifying School, earning a place on the European Tour for 2023.

Amateur wins
2008 Skandia Cup Riksfinal P-13, Skandia Tour Regional #3 - Bohuslän/Dalsland
2009 Karlstad Junior Masters
2010 Skandia Cup Riksfinal P-15, Skandia Tour riks #6 - Östergötland
2012 Swedish Junior Matchplay Championship
2013 Skandia Tour Elit #1 Pojkar

Source:

Professional wins (2)

Nordic Golf League wins (1)

Other wins (1)
2018 Hovås Open

Team appearances
Amateur
European Boys' Team Championship (representing Sweden): 2011, 2012 (winners), 2013
Duke of York Young Champions Trophy (representing Sweden): 2012
Junior Golf World Cup (representing Sweden): 2013
European Amateur Team Championship (representing Sweden): 2014, 2015

Sources:

References

External links

Swedish male golfers
European Tour golfers
Arizona State Sun Devils men's golfers
Sportspeople from Karlstad
1995 births
Living people